The Mirettes were a female vocal trio composed of former members of the Ikettes in the Ike & Tina Turner Revue.

History 
Robbie Montgomery, Venetta Fields and Jessie Smith were the first official incarnation of the Ikettes, a backing trio for Ike & Tina Turner. In 1965, the Ikettes had a top 40 pop hit with "Peaches 'N' Cream" and a top 20 R&B hit with "I'm So Thankful" on Modern Records. As their popularity grew, Ike Turner sent a different set of Ikettes on the road with "The Dick Clark Caravan of Stars" and kept Montgomery, Smith, and Fields on tour with his revue which caused much annoyance to the trio. They also were not receiving the extra money from their hits, so they left the revue in late 1965.

After trying unsuccessfully to continue using the name the Ikettes under management of Tina Turner's sister, Alline Bullock, they signed to Mirwood Records and changed their name to the Mirettes in 1966. After their two singles on the label did not chart, they signed to Revue Records where they had some success. Their first single, "In the Midnight Hour" reached No. 45 on the Billboard Hot 100 and No. 18 on the R&B chart. Their next two singles made little impression, as did a single on Minit Records in 1968 entitled "Help Wanted." In June 1968, they performed at the Soul-In show held by the Chicago chapter of the National Association of Television and Radio Announcers (NATRA).

A transfer to Uni Records in 1969 was more fruitful for them, but the songs were not big hits. That same year they sang on The Lost Man soundtrack produced by Quincy Jones. In 1970, they signed to the independent label, Zea Records, and released the raunchy "Ain't My Stuff Good Enough." Venetta Fields left the group and was replaced by former Ikette Pat Powdrill before they broke up in 1971.

Discography

Studio albums

Vocal credits 

 1969: The Lost Man (The Original Soundtrack Album)

Other appearances 

 1970: A Little Shot Of Rhythm & Blues (Rhapsody Records)
 2006: The Mirwood Soul Story Volume 2 (Kent dance)
 2010: Northern Soul Of Revue (Soul World)
 2016: Quincy Jones – The Cinema Of Quincy Jones (Decca Records)
 2017: Mirwood Northern Soul (Kent Dance)

Singles

References

External links 

 The Mirettes on AllMusic
 
 Ikettes/Mirettes Biography and Discography on Doo Wop Heaven

1966 establishments in the United States
1971 disestablishments in the United States
African-American girl groups
Ike & Tina Turner members
American soul musical groups
Musical groups from Los Angeles
Uni Records artists
Mirwood Records artists
Minit Records artists
Revue Records artists
American rhythm and blues musical groups
Musical groups established in 1966
Musical groups disestablished in 1971